Coleophora epijudaica is a moth of the family Coleophoridae. It is found in Spain, on Crete and in the Palestinian Territories.

References

entoloma
Moths described in 1935
Moths of Europe
Moths of Asia